Gugerd (also Romanized as Gūgerd) is a village in Zeri Rural District of Qatur District of Khoy County, West Azerbaijan province, Iran. At the 2006 National Census, its population was 2,407 in 415 households. The following census in 2011 counted 2,148 people in 449 households. The latest census in 2016 showed a population of 1,989 people in 469 households; it was the largest village in its rural district.

References 

Khoy County

Populated places in West Azerbaijan Province

Populated places in Khoy County